Sadya  is a meal of Kerala origin and of importance to all Malayalis, consisting of a variety of traditional vegetarian dishes usually served on a banana leaf in Kerala as lunch. Sadya means banquet in Malayalam. Sadya is typically served as a traditional feast for Onam, the state festival of Kerala and Vishu.

Overview

A typical Sadya can have about 24–28 dishes served as a single course. In cases where it is a much larger one it can have over 64 or more items, such as the Sadya for Aranmula Boatrace (Valla Sadya). During a traditional Sadya celebration, people are seated cross-legged on mats. Food is eaten with the right hand, without cutlery. The fingers are cupped to form a ladle.

The buttermilk is typically served near the end of the meal. The traditional dessert called payasam served at the end of the meal is of many kinds and usually three or more are served. Some of the varieties are Paal Ada prathaman, Ada pradhaman, Parippu prathaman, Chakkaprathaman, Gothampu payasam, Paal Payasam etc. The different 'Koottan' are made with different vegetables and have different flavours. The variety of curries is to symbolize prosperity and well being.

The dishes are served in different spots on the banana leaf. For example, the pickles are served on the top left corner and the banana on the bottom left corner, which helps the waiters to easily identify and decide on offering additional servings. The most common ingredients in all the dishes are vegetables, coconut and coconut oil as they are abundant in Kerala. Coconut milk is used in some dishes and coconut oil is used for frying.

There are variations in the menu depending on the place and religion. Some communities, especially those in the northern part of Kerala, include non-vegetarian dishes in the sadya. Although the custom is to use traditional and seasonal vegetables indigenous to Kerala or Southwest Coast of India, it has become common practice to include vegetables such as carrots, pineapples and beans in the dishes. Tradition has it that onion and garlic are not typically used in the sadya. Conventionally, the meal may be followed by chewing of vettila murukkaan, betel leaf with lime and arecanut. This helps digestion of the meal and also cleanses the palate. The sadya may had inspired the kamayan in Filipino cuisine with major differences.

Preparations

The sadya is usually served for lunch, although a lighter version is served for dinner too. Preparations begin the night before, and the dishes are prepared before ten o' clock in the morning on the day of the celebration.  On many occasions, sadya is served on tables, as people no longer find it convenient to sit on the floor. Sourcing of items/ingredients for Sadya is an elaborate and careful process to ensure quality.  The lighting of the fire to prepare the sadya is done after a prayer to Agni and the first serving is offered on a banana leaf in front of a lighted nilavilallku as an offering to god.

Traditionally, the people of the neighborhood spent the night helping the cooks in cooking.  They also volunteer to serve the food for the hosts to the guests.  This involves a fair amount of social interaction which help build rapport with the neighbors.

Sadya is served in pankthi (Sanskrit) – panthi in Malayalam – meaning in lines or rounds where sets of people are served in sitting lines, on the floor earlier, now on benches and desks. There can be many pankthis depending upon the size of the crowd and the capacity of the place.  The hosts normally sits only during the last pankthi.  The host will eat at the last and will go around every pankthi/panthi to greet the guests and to ensure that they are satisfied.

In a Sadya, the meals are served on a banana leaf. The leaf is folded and closed once the meal is finished. In some instances, closing the leaf toward you communicates satisfaction with the meal, while folding it away from oneself signifies that the meal can be improved. However, the direction the leaf is folded in can have different meanings in various parts of India.

The Central Travancore-style sadya is renowned to be the most disciplined and tradition-bound. There is usually an order followed in serving the dishes, starting from the chips and pickles first. However, different styles and approaches to making and serving the dishes are adopted in various parts of Kerala depending on local preferences.

Typical ingredients
The items include:

 Rice: It is the main item in a sadya. It is always the Kerala red rice (semi-polished parboiled brown) which is used for the Sadya. Kerala matta rice is sometimes used.
 Parippu: A thick curry lentil dish eaten with rice, papadum and ghee.
 Sambar: A thick gravy made of lentils, tamarind, vegetables like drumsticks, tomato, yam etc., and flavored with asafoetida.
 Rasam: A watery dish made of tamarind, tomatoes, and spices like black pepper, asafoetida, coriander, chili pepper, etc.  It is very spicy in taste and aids in digestion. However, in some regions Rasam is not counted as part of Sadya.
 Avial: A dense mixture of various vegetables and coconut, it is seasoned with curry leaves and coconut oil.
 Kaalan: Made of curd, coconut, and any one vegetable like "nendran" plantain or a tuber-like yam.  It is very thick and more sour, and typically can last for a longer period owing to the lower water content.
 Olan: A light dish, prepared of white gourd or black peas, coconut milk, and ginger seasoned with coconut oil.
 Koottukari: Vegetables like banana or yam cooked with chickpeas, coconut and black pepper.
 Erissery: A thick curry made from pumpkin, black-eyed peas and coconut.
 Pachadi: Sour curry made of curd and usually cucumber or sliced ash gourd cooked in coconut ground with mustard seeds and seasoned with sautéed mustard seeds and curry leaves. In Tamil Nadu, this dish is known as Pachadi. It is somewhat similar to a Raita.
 Sweet Pachadi: A sweet form of Pachadi, made with pineapple, pumpkin or grapes in curd. The gravy masala comprises coconut ground with cumin seeds and green chillies. Due to its sweetness, it is also called Madhura (sweet) curry in some places.
 Pulisseri: A sour, yellow-coloured thin curry made with slightly soured yoghurt and cucumber. A sweet variant called  'Mambazha Puliseri'  replaces cucumber with a combination of ripe mangoes and jaggery.
 Injipuli: A sweet pickle made of ginger, tamarind, green chilies, and jaggery, also called Puli-inji.
 Thoran: A dish of sautéed  vegetables such as peas, green beans, raw jackfruit, carrots, or cabbage (usually) with grated coconut.
 Mezhukkupuratti: A style of preparation for vegetarian dish where the vegetable is stir-fried with spices. Chopped onions or shallots may also be used.
 Achaar: Spicy pickles of raw mango (Mango pickle), lemon, lime, (Narangakari) etc.
 Pappadam: Made with lentil flour, it is crispy and can be eaten as an appetizer.
 Sharkara upperi: banana chips with jaggery
 Kaaya Varuthathu: banana chips
 Banana: A ripe banana is often served with the Sadya to be eaten with the dessert, Payasam.
 Chammanthi podi: coconut powder served as a dry condiment or chutney.
 Sambharam, also referred to as moru: A drink made from salted buttermilk with green chilli, ginger and curry leaves, it is drunk to improve digestion and is typically served near the end of the meal.

These side dishes are followed by desserts like Prathaman and Payasams. There is a strict order and placement of ingredients on the banana leaf. Aranmula Valla Sadya is the most celebrated one with over 64 items served in the traditional way.

Prathaman
Prathaman is a sweet dish in the form of a thick liquid; similar to payasam, but with more variety in terms of ingredients and more elaborately made.  It is made with white sugar or jaggery to which coconut milk is added. The main difference between a prathaman and a payasam is that the former uses coconut milk, while the liquid versions of payasam use cow's milk.
 Palada prathaman is made of flakes of cooked rice, milk, and sugar.
 Pazha prathaman is made of cooked "nendra" plantain or banana in jaggery and coconut milk.
 Gothambu prathaman is made of broken wheat.
 Parippu prathaman is made of green gram.
 Chakka prathaman is made of jackfruit.
 Ada pradhaman is made of Rice Ada (Rice flakes).
 Kadala prathaman is made from black gram.

Glossary of ingredients

See also

 Cuisine of Kerala
 Kamayan
 Onam sadya
 Pooram
 South Indian cuisine

References

External links
 

Kerala cuisine
Eating parties